Dancing on the Grave of Rock n' Roll is the fourth studio album by Australian hard rock band The Choirboys which was released in 1994 and is the follow-up to their previous studio album, Midnight Sun. It was produced by mainstay band members Mark Gable and Ian Hulme. Dancing on the Grave of Rock n' Roll didn't get the publicity of previous albums and failed to make an impact in the charts when released.

Track listing 
"Friday Night" – (Mark Gable, Ian Hulme, Lindsay Tebbutt, Brett Williams)
"Drops Like a Stone" – (Gable, Hulme)
"Hard Heart" – (Gable)
"Don't Say Goodbye" – (Gable, Hulme)
"Feels Good" – (Gable, Hulme)
"Dancing on the Grave of Rock n' Roll" – (Hulme)
"Keep It Up" – (Gable, Hulme)
"Della Meets Mr. Danger" – (Gable, Hulme)
"I Was a Boy Then" – (Gable, Hulme)
"Man in the Middle" – (Gable, Hulme)
"Alright Now" – (Gable, Hulme, Brad Carr, Tebbutt)
"My Recommendation" – (Gable, Hulme, Barton Price, Tebbutt, B Williams)
"Freudenstein's Monster" – (Gable, Hulme, Brad Heaney)

Personnel
Choirboys
Mark Gable – vocals, guitars, keyboards
Ian Hulme – vocals, bass guitar

Additional musicians
Bernie Bremond – saxophone
Brad Heaney – drums
Rory Mckenzie – drums
Gene O'Reilly – guitar
Russell Pilling – backing vocals
Suzanne Serelle – backing vocals
Dave Steel – harmonica
Gregory Mark Truswell – guitar, backing vocals
Peter Wells – slide guitar

Production details
Producer – Mark Gable, Ian Hulme

References
 

The Choirboys (band) albums
1996 albums